Samir Maalouf is a Lebanese actor and voice actor.

Filmography

Film 
Fire of Love. 1968
Hello Love. 1968

Television 

Stingies. 1983
Honesty - Samir. 1982
The White Mask. 1974
Adventures of Nader - Zakarya. 1969
International Comedy

Plays

Dubbing roles 
 Ben 10: Alien Force - Max Tennyson
 Ben 10: Ultimate Alien - Max Tennyson
 Ben 10: Omniverse - Max Tennyson, Mr. Baumann, Will Harangue
 Cars - Mater (Classical Arabic version)
 Cars 2 - Mater (Classical Arabic version)
 Chicken Little - Turkey Lurkey (Classical Arabic version)
 Finding Nemo - Gill (Classical Arabic version)
 Inside Out - Fear
 Meet the Robinsons - Bud Robinson (Classical Arabic version)
 The Looney Tunes Show - Elmer Fudd (Lebanese dubbing version)

References

External links 
 

Lebanese male actors
Lebanese male voice actors
Living people
20th-century Lebanese male actors
21st-century Lebanese male actors
Year of birth missing (living people)